The Clark County Water Reclamation District (District) is a government wastewater treatment agency in Clark County, Nevada. As a member of the Southern Nevada Water Authority, its mission is to treat millions of gallons of wastewater that is produced every day.  The District is the largest water treatment agency in Southern Nevada and is responsible for treating wastewater from unincorporated parts of Clark County within the Las Vegas Valley, including most of the Las Vegas Strip, and the communities of Blue Diamond, Moapa Valley, Indian Springs, Laughlin, and Searchlight.

The district was created by judicial decree in August 1954. Prior to that time, the treatment of sewage in unincorporated Clark County was by means of cesspools, septic tanks, and several small treatment plants operated by the hotels along the Las Vegas Strip. The continuing growth of both the tourist and residential portions of the community pointed out the need for more sanitary and efficient means of treating the wastewater.

Other wastewater in the Las Vegas Valley is treated by individual cities that operate their own treatment facilities.

See also
 Clark County Regional Flood Control District

External links
 Clark County Water Reclamation District website

1954 establishments in Nevada
Government agencies established in 1954
Government of Clark County, Nevada
Public utilities of the United States
Water management authorities in the United States